Keegan Rosenberry (born December 11, 1993) is an American professional soccer player who plays as a right-back for Major League Soccer club Colorado Rapids.

Youth and college
He played at Penn Fusion soccer club. 
Rosenberry played his four years of high school soccer at Lancaster Mennonite High School between 2008 and 2012. While there, he was on teams that won district titles as well as a state title his senior year.

Rosenberry played four years of college soccer at Georgetown University between 2012 and 2015, making 90 appearances and scoring four goals.

While at college, Rosenberry also appeared for Premier Development League side Reading United AC in 2013 and 2015.

Professional

Philadelphia Union
On January 11, 2016, Rosenberry was selected 3rd overall in the 2016 MLS SuperDraft by Philadelphia Union. He made his Union debut on March 6, 2016, during a 0–2 loss against FC Dallas.
During the 2016 season, he started every game, playing the full 90 minutes. In the home opener, he was nominated for man of the match as well as being selected to the MLS Team of the Week. In July 2016 he was also voted into the roster for the 2016 MLS All-Star Game, and at the end of the season came second in voting for 2016 Rookie of the Year.

Colorado Rapids
On December 19, 2018, Rosenberry was traded to Colorado Rapids in exchange for $150,000 General Allocation in 2019, $50,000 Targeted Allocation in 2019 and $100,000 General Allocation in 2020, plus $100,000 in conditional payments. 

On February 20, 2019, Rosenberry signed a three-year contract extension through the 2022 season. Rosenberry started and played a full 90 minutes in all 34 regular season matches for Colorado, one of just three outfield players to play all 3,060 minutes. It was Rosenberry's second time accomplishing the feat, after doing so in his rookie year in Philadelphia. Rosenberry scored his first goal for Colorado and added an assist against Toronto FC on September 15 He was named to the MLS Team of the Week in Week 23 

In 2020, Rosenberry made 16 starts among 17 league appearances, and played a full 90 minutes in Colorado's MLS Cup Playoff first-round loss to Minnesota United FC. Rosenberry picked up two assists and scored one goal, game-winning volley against Seattle Sounders FC on November 1, which was named MLS Goal of the Week in Week 22.

In January 2022, Colorado announced they had signed Rosenberry to a three-year contract extension.

International
On January 5, 2017, following his first professional season, Rosenberry was called up to the senior United States squad by coach Bruce Arena. He was called up again under newly appointed head coach Gregg Berhalter for the January 2019 friendlies. However, he did not appear in any of the matches during these camps.

Career statistics

Honors
Individual
MLS All-Star: 2016
MLS Fair Play Award: 2016

References

External links
 Georgetown profile
 

Living people
1993 births
American soccer players
Soccer players from Pennsylvania
Sportspeople from Harrisburg, Pennsylvania
Association football fullbacks
Georgetown Hoyas men's soccer players
Reading United A.C. players
Philadelphia Union draft picks
Philadelphia Union players
Philadelphia Union II players
Colorado Rapids players
Colorado Rapids 2 players
USL League Two players
Major League Soccer players
USL Championship players
Major League Soccer All-Stars
MLS Next Pro players